The ninth season of Food Paradise, an American food reality television series narrated by Jess Blaze Snider (formally Mason Pettit) on the Travel Channel, premiered on October 16, 2016. First-run episodes of the series aired in the United States on the Travel Channel on Mondays at 10:00 p.m. EDT. The season contained 13 episodes and concluded airing on January 15, 2017.

Food Paradise features the best places to find various cuisines at food locations across America. Each episode focuses on a certain type of restaurant, such as "Diners", "Bars", "Drive-Thrus" or "Breakfast" places that people go to find a certain food specialty.

Episodes

Taco-Lanche!

Brunch-Nado!

Super Sandwiches

Pizza Party

Southern Comfort Food

Midnight Munchies

Winner Winner Chicken Dinner

Italian Eats

BBQ Bliss

Extra Cheesy

Iconic Eats

Best Mex

Surf and Turf

References

External links
Food Paradise @Travelchannel.com

2016 American television seasons
2017 American television seasons